Hypselodoris sagamiensis is a species of sea slug or dorid nudibranch, a marine gastropod mollusk in the family Chromodorididae.

Distribution
This nudibranch is known only from Japan., India

Description
Hypselodoris sagamiensis has a white-translucent body with black spots on its mantle. The mantle is edged with an outer purple and inner yellow line. The gills and rhinophores are orange, sometimes outlined in white.

This species can reach a total length of at least 30 mm and has been observed feeding on sponges from the genus Euryspongia.

References

Chromodorididae
Gastropods described in 1949
Marine gastropods